Otto Max Koegel (16 October 1895 – 27 June 1946) was a Nazi officer who served as a commander at Lichtenburg, Ravensbrück, Majdanek and Flossenbürg concentration camps.

Life
Max Koegel was born on 16 October 1895 in Füssen, in the Kingdom of Bavaria. He was the fourth son of a carpenter who worked at a local furniture factory. Shortly before his sixth birthday, Koegel's mother died from complications during childbirth. In 1907, his father died and Max was sent to live with a family at a nearby farm. He also had to leave school and began training as a shepherd and later worked as a mountain guide.

When the First World War broke out, Koegel volunteered to join the Bavarian infantry. He served in the military until 12 January 1919 and reached the rank of corporal. He was wounded three times, including once during the Battle of Verdun, and received the Iron Cross second class.

After the war, Koegel returned to Bavaria and worked as a customs clerk in Garmisch-Partenkirchen. In 1920, he left the civil service and opened a souvenir shop. However, four years later he filed for bankruptcy after he was charged with fraud, for which he received a suspended sentence. He went on to travel for work in Switzerland and Austria before returning to Füssen, where he obtained a job in his father's old furniture factory. At that time, he joined the Völkischer Bund and Bund Oberland, both extreme nationalist and anti-Semitic organisations. In 1929, Koegel's eight-year-old son died from measles and a short time later, his marriage of ten years ended in divorce. Koegel became a member of the NSDAP (#1179781) on 2 May 1932, and of the SS (#37644) in June 1932.

SS service
Koegel became adjutant to the Dachau concentration camp commander in 1937. From 1938 to 1942 he was first "Direktor" (managing director) and then commander of the labour camp for women in Lichtenburg at Ravensbrück at the rank of Sturmbannführer (Major). In 1942 he was commander of the extermination camp Majdanek and was involved in the installation of gas chambers at this site. From 1943 to 1945 he was commander at Flossenbürg concentration camp.

Arrest and suicide
After the war, Koegel went on the run and initially managed to evade arrest. However, in June 1946, he was arrested by U.S. occupation forces in Bavaria. He was sent to a prison in Schwabach. Koegel hanged himself the next day, on 27 June 1946.

See also
 List of people who died by suicide by hanging

References

 Silke Schäfer: Zum Selbstverständnis von Frauen im Konzentrationslager. Das Lager Ravensbrück Dissertation, TU Berlin 2002.
 Tom Segev: Die Soldaten des Bösen. Zur Geschichte der KZ-Kommandanten. Rowohlt, Reinbek bei Hamburg 1995, .
 Ernst Klee: Das Personenlexikon zum Dritten Reich: Wer war was vor und nach 1945. Fischer-Taschenbuch-Verlag, Frankfurt am Main 2005. .

1895 births
1946 suicides
People from Füssen
Holocaust perpetrators in Germany
Holocaust perpetrators in Poland
People from the Kingdom of Bavaria
Dachau concentration camp personnel
Flossenbürg concentration camp personnel
Majdanek concentration camp personnel
Ravensbrück concentration camp personnel
Nazis who committed suicide in prison custody
SS-Obersturmbannführer
Nazi concentration camp commandants
Nazis who committed suicide in Germany
Suicides by hanging in Germany
Recipients of the Iron Cross (1914), 2nd class
Lichtenburg concentration camp personnel
20th-century Freikorps personnel
German Army personnel of World War I
Prisoners who died in United States military detention